The Greece men's national Under-16 basketball team, or Greek Cadets national basketball team, is the representative for Greece in international Under-16 age basketball competitions. It is organized and run by the Hellenic Basketball Federation (E.O.K.). The Greece men's Under-16 national basketball team represents Greece at the FIBA Europe Under-16 Championship.

FIBA Europe Under-16 Championship

External links
Official Website 

under
Men's national under-16 basketball teams